The compound hydrogen chloride has the chemical formula  and as such is a hydrogen halide. At room temperature, it is a colourless gas, which forms white fumes of hydrochloric acid upon contact with atmospheric water vapor. Hydrogen chloride gas and hydrochloric acid are important in technology and industry. Hydrochloric acid, the aqueous solution of hydrogen chloride, is also commonly given the formula HCl.

Reactions 

Hydrogen chloride is a diatomic molecule, consisting of a hydrogen atom H and a chlorine atom Cl connected by a polar covalent bond. The chlorine atom is much more electronegative than the hydrogen atom, which makes this bond polar. Consequently, the molecule has a large dipole moment with a negative partial charge (δ−) at the chlorine atom and a positive partial charge (δ+) at the hydrogen atom. In part because of its high polarity, HCl is very soluble in water (and in other polar solvents).

Upon contact,  and HCl combine to form hydronium cations  and chloride anions  through a reversible chemical reaction:

The resulting solution is called hydrochloric acid and is a strong acid. The acid dissociation or ionization constant, Ka, is large, which means HCl dissociates or ionizes practically completely in water. Even in the absence of water, hydrogen chloride can still act as an acid. For example, hydrogen chloride can dissolve in certain other solvents such as methanol:

Hydrogen chloride can protonate molecules or ions and can also serve as an acid-catalyst for chemical reactions where anhydrous (water-free) conditions are desired.

Because of its acidic nature, hydrogen chloride is a corrosive substance, particularly in the presence of moisture.

Structure and properties 

Frozen HCl undergoes phase transition at 98.4 K. X-ray powder diffraction of the frozen material shows that the material changes from an orthorhombic structure to a cubic one during this transition. In both structures the chlorine atoms are in a face-centered array. However, the hydrogen atoms could not be located. Analysis of spectroscopic and dielectric data, and determination of the structure of DCl (deuterium chloride) indicates that HCl forms zigzag chains in the solid, as does HF (see figure on right).

The infrared spectrum of gaseous hydrogen chloride, shown on the left, consists of a number of sharp absorption lines grouped around 2886 cm−1 (wavelength ~3.47 µm). At room temperature, almost all molecules are in the ground vibrational state v = 0. Including anharmonicity the vibrational energy can be written as.

To promote an HCl molecule from the v = 0 to the v = 1 state, we would expect to see an infrared absorption about νo = νe + 2xeνe = 2880 cm−1. However, this absorption corresponding to the Q-branch is not observed due to it being forbidden by symmetry. Instead, two sets of signals (P- and R-branches) are seen owing to a simultaneous change in the rotational state of the molecules. Because of quantum mechanical selection rules, only certain rotational transitions are permitted. The states are characterized by the rotational quantum number J = 0, 1, 2, 3, ... selection rules state that ΔJ is only able to take values of ±1.

The value of the rotational constant B is much smaller than the vibrational one νo, such that a much smaller amount of energy is required to rotate the molecule; for a typical molecule, this lies within the microwave region. However, the vibrational energy of HCl molecule places its absorptions within the infrared region, allowing a spectrum showing the rovibrational transitions of this molecule to be easily collected using an infrared spectrometer with a gas cell. The latter can even be made of quartz as the HCl absorption lies in a window of transparency for this material.

Naturally abundant chlorine consists of two isotopes, 35Cl and 37Cl, in a ratio of approximately 3:1. While the spring constants are nearly identical, the disparate reduced masses of H35Cl and H37Cl cause measurable differences in the rotational energy, thus doublets are observed on close inspection of each absorption line, weighted in the same ratio of 3:1.

Production 
Most hydrogen chloride produced on an industrial scale is used for hydrochloric acid production.

Historical routes
In the 17th century, Johann Rudolf Glauber from Karlstadt am Main, Germany used sodium chloride salt and sulfuric acid for the preparation of sodium sulfate in the Mannheim process, releasing hydrogen chloride. Joseph Priestley of Leeds, England prepared pure hydrogen chloride in 1772, and by 1808 Humphry Davy of Penzance, England had proved that the chemical composition included hydrogen and chlorine.

Direct synthesis 

Hydrogen chloride is produced by combining chlorine and hydrogen:

As the reaction is exothermic, the installation is called an HCl oven or HCl burner. The resulting hydrogen chloride gas is absorbed in deionized water, resulting in chemically pure hydrochloric acid. This reaction can give a very pure product, e.g. for use in the food industry.

The reaction can also be triggered by blue light.

Organic synthesis 
The industrial production of hydrogen chloride is often integrated with the formation of chlorinated and fluorinated organic compounds, e.g., Teflon, Freon, and other CFCs, as well as chloroacetic acid and PVC. Often this production of hydrochloric acid is integrated with captive use of it on-site. In the chemical reactions, hydrogen atoms on the hydrocarbon are replaced by chlorine atoms, whereupon the released hydrogen atom recombines with the spare atom from the chlorine molecule, forming hydrogen chloride. Fluorination is a subsequent chlorine-replacement reaction, producing again hydrogen chloride:

RCl + HF → RF + HCl
The resulting hydrogen chloride is either reused directly or absorbed in water, resulting in hydrochloric acid of technical or industrial grade.

Laboratory methods 
Small amounts of hydrogen chloride for laboratory use can be generated in an HCl generator by dehydrating hydrochloric acid with either sulfuric acid or anhydrous calcium chloride. Alternatively, HCl can be generated by the reaction of sulfuric acid with sodium chloride:

This reaction occurs at room temperature. Provided there is NaCl remaining in the generator and it is heated above 200 °C, the reaction proceeds further:

For such generators to function, the reagents should be dry.

Hydrogen chloride can also be prepared by the hydrolysis of certain reactive chloride compounds such as phosphorus chlorides, thionyl chloride, and acyl chlorides. For example, cold water can be gradually dripped onto phosphorus pentachloride to give HCl:

Applications 
Most hydrogen chloride is used in the production of hydrochloric acid. It is also used in the production of vinyl chloride and many alkyl chlorides. Trichlorosilane is produced using HCl:

History 
Around 900, the authors of the Arabic writings attributed to Jabir ibn Hayyan (Latin: Geber) and the Persian physician and alchemist Abu Bakr al-Razi (c. 865–925, Latin: Rhazes) were experimenting with sal ammoniac (ammonium chloride), which when it was distilled together with vitriol (hydrated sulfates of various metals) produced hydrogen chloride. It is possible that in one of his experiments, al-Razi stumbled upon a primitive method to produce hydrochloric acid. However, it appears that in most of these early experiments with chloride salts, the gaseous products were discarded, and hydrogen chloride may have been produced many times before it was discovered that it can be put to chemical use.

One of the first such uses was the synthesis of mercury(II) chloride (corrosive sublimate), whose production from the heating of mercury either with alum and ammonium chloride or with vitriol and sodium chloride was first described in the De aluminibus et salibus ("On Alums and Salts"), an eleventh- or twelfth century Arabic text falsely attributed to Abu Bakr al-Razi and translated into Latin by Gerard of Cremona (1144–1187).

Another important development was the discovery by pseudo-Geber (in the De inventione veritatis, "On the Discovery of Truth", after c. 1300) that by adding ammonium chloride to nitric acid, a strong solvent capable of dissolving gold (i.e., aqua regia) could be produced.

After the discovery in the late sixteenth century of the process by which unmixed hydrochloric acid can be prepared, it was recognized that this new acid (then known as spirit of salt or acidum salis) released vaporous hydrogen chloride, which was called marine acid air. In the 17th century, Johann Rudolf Glauber used salt (sodium chloride) and sulfuric acid for the preparation of sodium sulfate, releasing hydrogen chloride gas (see production, above). In 1772, Carl Wilhelm Scheele also reported this reaction and is sometimes credited with its discovery. Joseph Priestley prepared hydrogen chloride in 1772, and in 1810 Humphry Davy established that it is composed of hydrogen and chlorine.

During the Industrial Revolution, demand for alkaline substances such as soda ash increased, and Nicolas Leblanc developed a new industrial-scale process for producing the soda ash. In the Leblanc process, salt was converted to soda ash, using sulfuric acid, limestone, and coal, giving hydrogen chloride as by-product. Initially, this gas was vented to air, but the Alkali Act of 1863 prohibited such release, so then soda ash producers absorbed the HCl waste gas in water, producing hydrochloric acid on an industrial scale. Later, the Hargreaves process was developed, which is similar to the Leblanc process except sulfur dioxide, water, and air are used instead of sulfuric acid in a reaction which is exothermic overall. In the early 20th century the Leblanc process was effectively replaced by the Solvay process, which did not produce HCl. However, hydrogen chloride production continued as a step in hydrochloric acid production.

Historical uses of hydrogen chloride in the 20th century include hydrochlorinations of alkynes in producing the chlorinated monomers chloroprene and vinyl chloride, which are subsequently polymerized to make polychloroprene (Neoprene) and polyvinyl chloride (PVC), respectively. In the production of vinyl chloride, acetylene is hydrochlorinated by adding the HCl across the triple bond of the  molecule, turning the triple into a double bond, yielding vinyl chloride.

The "acetylene process", used until the 1960s for making chloroprene, starts out by joining two acetylene molecules, and then adds HCl to the joined intermediate across the triple bond to convert it to chloroprene as shown here:

This "acetylene process" has been replaced by a process which adds  to the double bond of ethylene instead, and subsequent elimination produces HCl instead, as well as chloroprene.

Safety 
Hydrogen chloride forms corrosive hydrochloric acid on contact with water found in body tissue. Inhalation of the fumes can cause coughing, choking, inflammation of the nose, throat, and upper respiratory tract, and in severe cases, pulmonary edema, circulatory system failure, and death. Skin contact can cause redness, pain, and severe chemical burns. Hydrogen chloride may cause severe burns to the eye and permanent eye damage.

The U.S. Occupational Safety and Health Administration and the National Institute for Occupational Safety and Health have established occupational exposure limits for hydrogen chloride at a ceiling of 5 ppm (7 mg/m3), and compiled extensive information on hydrogen chloride workplace safety concerns.

See also 
 Gastric acid, hydrochloric acid secreted into the stomach to aid digestion of proteins
 Chloride, salts of hydrogen chloride
 Hydrochloride, organic salts of hydrochloric acid
 Hydrochlorination, addition reaction with alkenes

References

External links 

 
 Thames & Kosmos Chem C2000 Experiment Manual

Chlorides
Halogen-containing natural products
Hazardous air pollutants
Hydrogen compounds
Industrial gases
Nonmetal halides
Diatomic molecules
Articles containing video clips